Anthony Kevin Descotte (born 3 August 2003) is a Belgian football player. He plays for Eredivisie club Utrecht on loan from Charleroi.

Club career
He made his Belgian First Division A debut for Charleroi on 17 April 2021 in a game against Eupen.

On 31 January 2023, Descotte was loaned by Utrecht in the Netherlands until the end of the 2022–23 season, with an option to extend the loan for the 2023–24 season.

References

External links
 
 

2003 births
Living people
Belgian footballers
Belgium youth international footballers
Belgium under-21 international footballers
Association football forwards
R. Charleroi S.C. players
FC Utrecht players
Belgian Pro League players
Belgian National Division 1 players
Belgian expatriate footballers
Expatriate footballers in the Netherlands
Belgian expatriate sportspeople in the Netherlands